Charles Hayden may refer to:
Charles Hayden (banker) (1870–1937), American financier and philanthropist
Charles T. Hayden (1825–1900), American judge and pioneer
C. Hayden Coffin (1862–1935), English actor and singer
J. Charles Haydon (1876–1943), American silent film director, actor and screenwriter
Charles J. Hayden (mayor) (1816–1888), Mayor of Rochester, New York

See also
 Charles Haden (disambiguation)